Jackson Township is one of fifteen townships in Greene County, Indiana, USA.  As of the 2010 census, its population was 1,947.

Geography
The streams of Cole Branch, Dry Branch, Little Indian Creek, Miller Creek, Mitchell Branch and Town Branch run through this township.

Unincorporated towns
 Koleen
 Owensburg
(This list is based on USGS data and may include former settlements.)

Adjacent townships
 Center Township (north)
 Indian Creek Township, Monroe County (northeast)
 Perry Township, Lawrence County (east)
 Indian Creek Township, Lawrence County (southeast)
 Mitcheltree Township, Martin County (south)
 Perry Township, Martin County (southwest)
 Taylor Township (west)
 Richland Township (northwest)

Cemeteries
The township contains eleven cemeteries: Cooper, Dishman, Duke, Freeman, Holder, Howell, Miller, Robison, Rush, Wagoner and Walker.

Major highways

References
 
 United States Census Bureau cartographic boundary files

External links
 Indiana Township Association
 United Township Association of Indiana

Townships in Greene County, Indiana
Bloomington metropolitan area, Indiana
Townships in Indiana